Eiske ten Bos-Harkema was a Dutch politician.

She became the first Alderman in The Netherlands in 1924.

References

20th-century Dutch women politicians
20th-century Dutch politicians